Guillermo Zapata (born 1928) is a Colombian sprinter. He competed in the men's 4 × 400 metres relay at the 1956 Summer Olympics.

References

External links

1928 births
Possibly living people
Athletes (track and field) at the 1955 Pan American Games
Athletes (track and field) at the 1956 Summer Olympics
Colombian male sprinters
Colombian male hurdlers
Olympic athletes of Colombia
Place of birth missing (living people)
Pan American Games competitors for Colombia
20th-century Colombian people